Jesper B. Jensen Aabo (born 30 July 1991), is a Danish professional ice hockey defenceman who currently plays for EC KAC of the ICE Hockey League (ICEHL). He was a member of the Denmark men's national ice hockey team for the 2011 IIHF World Championship. At just 19 years of age, he was the youngest member of the Danish team.

Playing career
Having played all of his youth hockey with Rødovre as well as three seasons with Rødovre Mighty Bulls of the Danish Elite League, Jensen is regarded as one of the most talented defencemen to come out of Denmark in recent years, he was sought after by Rögle as well as Malmö Redhawks before deciding to join the Ängelholm team prior to the 2010–11 season.

After playing four seasons in the Kontinental Hockey League with Finnish club, Jokerit, Jensen left as a free agent following the 2018–19 season, returning to the SHL in agreeing to a two-year contract with the Malmö Redhawks on April 18, 2019.

Following a lone season in the Deutsche Eishockey Liga (DEL) with Krefeld Pinguine in 2021–22, Jensen moved to the neighbouring ICE Hockey League, joining Austrian based club, EC KAC, on 5 May 2022.

Playing style
Jensen is considered an all-round defenceman with an emphasis on defensive and physical play.

References

External links
 

1991 births
Danish ice hockey defencemen
Färjestad BK players
Jokerit players
Krefeld Pinguine players
Living people
Rødovre Mighty Bulls players
Rögle BK players
People from Rødovre
Danish expatriate sportspeople in Sweden
Danish expatriates in Finland
Ice hockey players at the 2022 Winter Olympics
Olympic ice hockey players of Denmark
Sportspeople from the Capital Region of Denmark